Taenaris onolaus is a butterfly of the family Nymphalidae. It is found on New Guinea.

Subspecies
Taenaris onolaus onolaus (western West Irian, Mioswar Island)
Taenaris onolaus ida Honrath, 1889 (eastern New Guinea: Huon Peninsula)
Taenaris onolaus saturatior Fruhstorfer (southern and south-western Papua New Guinea)
Taenaris onolaus shapur Brooks, 1944 (West Irian (Weyland Mountains, Wandammen Mountains)

References

Taenaris
Lepidoptera of New Guinea